Saline water (more commonly known as salt water) is water that contains a high concentration of dissolved salts (mainly sodium chloride). On the United States Geological Survey (USGS) salinity scale, saline water is saltier than brackish water, but less salty than brine. The salt concentration is usually expressed in parts per thousand (permille, ‰) and parts per million (ppm). The USGS salinity scale defines three levels of saline water. The salt concentration in slightly saline water is 1,000 to 3,000 ppm (0.1–0.3%); in moderately saline water is 3,000 to 10,000 ppm (0.3–1%); and in highly saline water is 10,000 to 35,000 ppm (1–3.5%). Seawater has a salinity of roughly 35,000 ppm, equivalent to 35 grams of salt per one liter (or kilogram) of water. The saturation level is only nominally dependent on the temperature of the water. At  one liter of water can dissolve about 357 grams of salt, a concentration of 26.3% w/w. At boiling the amount that can be dissolved in one liter of water increases to about 391 grams, a concentration of 28.1% w/w.

Properties 

At , saturated sodium chloride brine is about 28% salt by weight. At , brine can only hold about 26% salt. At 20 °C one liter of water can dissolve about 357 grams of salt, a concentration of 26.3%.

The thermal conductivity decreases with increasing salinity and increases with increasing temperature.

The salt content can be determined with a salinometer.

Density ρ of brine at various concentrations and temperatures from  can be approximated with a linear equation:

where the values of an are:

Electrolysis
About four percent of hydrogen gas produced worldwide is created by electrolysis. The majority of this hydrogen produced through electrolysis is a side product in the production of chlorine.
2 NaCl(aq) + 2 H2O(l) → 2 NaOH(aq) + H2(g) + Cl2(g)

See also 
 Brackish water
 Brine
 Salinity
 Seawater

References

External links

Liquid water
Solutions